The German Ice Hockey Federation, commonly abbreviated as DEB, is the governing federation of German ice hockey associations. It was established on 16 June 1963 in Krefeld. Until 1990 it served only the old Federal Republic of Germany and West Berlin. Until the establishment of the DEB, ice hockey was one of many different ice and winter sports overseen by the Deutschen Eissport-Verband.

The German Ice Hockey Federation took over the responsibility for the supra-regional leagues (especially the Bundesliga) and for the national team. It became the additional West German representative in the International Ice Hockey Federation.

Presidents
1963/64 Ludwig Zametzer (Füssen)/ Dr. Günther Sabetzki (Düsseldorf) were co-Presidents
1964–1992 Otto Wanner (Füssen)
1992–1995 Ulf Jäkel (Kaufbeuren)
1995–2002 Rainer Gossmann (Düsseldorf)
2002–2008 Hans-Ulrich Esken (Schwerte)
2008–2010 interim: Uwe Harnos (Kaufbeuren)
2010–2014 Uwe Harnos (Kaufbeuren)
2014–    Franz Reindl (Garmisch-Partenkirchen)

Vice presidents

1963/64 position vacant
1964–1984 Dr. Günther Sabetzki (Düsseldorf)
1984–1988 Dr. Ernst Eichler (Mannheim)
1988–1991 Rudolf Gandorfer (Landshut)
1991–1993 Heinz Landen (Köln)
1993–1995 Dr. Wolfgang Bonenkamp (Düsseld.)
1995–2002 Rudolf Schnabel (Nürnberg)
2002–2008 Uwe Harnos (Kaufbeuren)
2002–2010 Bodo Lauterjung (Ingolstadt)
2002–2002 Jochen Haselbacher (Hannover)
2004–2008 Wolfgang Brück (Iserlohn)
2008–2014 Erich Kühnhackl (Landshut)
2010–2014 Manuel Hüttl (Thaining)
2010–2014 Ramund Schneeweis (Hamm)
2014–   Daniel Hopp (Heidelberg)
2014–   Berthold Wipfler (Walldorf)
2014–   Marc Hindelang (Lindau)

Directors

1970–86 Roman Neumayer (Olching)
1986–92 Helmut Bauer (Garmisch-P.)
1992–2011 Franz Reindl (Garmisch-P.)
2012–2013 Pat Cortina
2013–2017 Ernst Höfner
2017– Stefan Schaidnagel

Team officials
General Manager
Toni Söderholm
Trainer
Toni Söderholm (Trainer)
Tobias Abstreiter (Co-Trainer)
Christian Künast (Co-Trainer)
Geoff Ward (Co-Trainer)
Patrick Dallaire (Goalie-Trainer)

References

External links 
 

Ice hockey in Germany
International Ice Hockey Federation members
Ice hockey governing bodies in Europe
Sports organizations established in 1963